Rosa María Farfán Márquez is a Mexican researcher in social epistemology and mathematics education, affiliated with CINVESTAV in the Instituto Politécnico Nacional.

Education and career
Farfán has been a researcher for CINVESTAV since 1985. She completed a doctorate through CINVESTAV in 1993, with the dissertation Construcción de la noción de convergencia en ámbitos fenomenológicos vinculados a la ingeniería: Estudio de caso, jointly supervised by Carlos Ímaz Janhke and Fernando Hitt. She was a postdoctoral researcher at Paris Diderot University before returning to CINVESTAV.

She became the founding editor in chief of the journal Revista Latinoamericana de Investigación en Matemática Educativa (Relime) in 1997, remaining editor until 2007.

Recognition
Farfán was elected to the Mexican Academy of Sciences in 2001.

References

External links

Year of birth missing (living people)
Living people
Mexican mathematicians
Mexican women mathematicians
Mathematics educators
Members of the Mexican Academy of Sciences